Phyllonorycter restrictella is a moth of the family Gracillariidae. It is known from Québec in Canada and New York, Maine, Connecticut, Vermont, Pennsylvania and Michigan in the United States.

The larvae feed on Castanea dentata, Fagus grandifolia and Fagus sylvatica. They mine the leaves of their host plant. The mine has the form of an elongate, tentiform, underside mine between two lateral veins.

References

External links
mothphotographersgroup
Bug Guide

restrictella
Moths of North America
Moths described in 1939